Eotrogulus is an extinct genus of harvestmen known from the Carboniferous fossil record.  The genus is the only member of the family Eotrogulidae and contains one species Eotrogulus fayoli. Eotrogulus was found in the Coal Measures of Commentry in northern France, together with Nemastomoides elaveris. Eotrogulus was previously thought to be a trigonotarbid.

Footnotes

References
 Joel Hallan's Biology Catalog: Eotrogulidae
 Thevenin, A. (1901): Sur la découverte d'arachnides dans le terrain houiller de Commentry. Bull Soc Géol. Fr. 4(1): 605-611.
 Petrunkevitch, A. I. (1955): Arachnida. pp. 42–162 in Treatise on Invertebrate Palaeontology, part P. Arthropoda 2 (R. C. Moore, ed.). Geological Society of America & University of Kansas Press, Lawrence.
 Pinto-da-Rocha, R., Machado, G. & Giribet, G. (eds.) (2007): Harvestmen - The Biology of Opiliones. Harvard University Press 

Harvestmen
Carboniferous arachnids
Carboniferous arthropods
Fossils of France
Fossil taxa described in 1901